Javier López Zavala (born January 9 1969) is a Mexican politician affiliated with the PRI. As of 2013 he served as Deputy of the LXII Legislature of the Mexican Congress representing Puebla.

He was arrested June 6, 2022 in Puebla for the femicide of the lawyer and activist Cecilia Monzón.

References

1969 births
Living people
People from Chiapas
Institutional Revolutionary Party politicians
21st-century Mexican politicians
Deputies of the LXII Legislature of Mexico
Members of the Chamber of Deputies (Mexico) for Puebla